Ludwig Preis (11 November 1971 – 27 May 2017) was a German football coach who once managed SpVgg Greuther Fürth on an interim basis after Mike Büskens was sacked. From 11 March 2013 until end of season he was assistant of manager Frank Kramer. 2013/14 he managed SpVgg U23 team but left after the end of season.

Preis died on 27 May 2017 after a long illness. He was without a club when he died.

References

1971 births
2017 deaths
SpVgg Greuther Fürth managers
German football managers
People from Passau
Sportspeople from Lower Bavaria